Anaikudam is a village in the Udayarpalayam taluk of Ariyalur district, Tamil Nadu, India.

Demographics 

As per the 2001 census, Anaikudam had a total population of 4182 with 2139 males and 2043 females.

References 

Villages in Ariyalur district